Michael J Sullivan (born 6 December 1942) is a British former sport shooter.

Sport shooting career
Sullivan competed in the 1984 Summer Olympics. He received the bronze medal in that event, with 596 points.

He represented England and won a gold medal in the 50 metres rifle prone pair with Malcolm Cooper, at the 1982 Commonwealth Games in Brisbane, Queensland, Australia.

References

1942 births
Living people
British male sport shooters
ISSF rifle shooters
Olympic shooters of Great Britain
Shooters at the 1984 Summer Olympics
Olympic bronze medallists for Great Britain
Olympic medalists in shooting
Medalists at the 1984 Summer Olympics
Commonwealth Games medallists in shooting
Commonwealth Games gold medallists for England
Shooters at the 1982 Commonwealth Games
Medallists at the 1982 Commonwealth Games